Union Street North–Cabarrus Avenue Commercial Historic District is a national historic district located at Concord, Cabarrus County, North Carolina. The district encompasses 14 contributing buildings in the central business district of Concord. It primarily includes commercial buildings in popular architectural styles including Beaux-Arts style architecture. Located in the district are the Bell and Harris-Maxwell Brothers Furniture Store (1921–1924), Yorke and Wadsworth Company Warehouse (1908–1911), Lippard and Barrier Grocery (1908–1911), Concord National Bank and Hotel Concord (1926), Star Theatre (c. 1890; 1913–1920), Cannon Building and Concord Theatre (1920–1924; 1925), and Horton Building–Commerce and Merchants Building (1952).

It was listed on the National Register of Historic Places in 2003.

References

Historic districts on the National Register of Historic Places in North Carolina
Beaux-Arts architecture in North Carolina
Buildings and structures in Cabarrus County, North Carolina
National Register of Historic Places in Cabarrus County, North Carolina